Yevgeny Gavrilovich Kibkalo (12 February 1932, Kyiv – 12 February 2003, Moscow) was a Soviet and Russian operatic baritone singer and pedagogue. People's Artist of the RSFSR (1970).

Kiblako notably sang Petruchio for Zdeněk Chalabala's recording of Shebalin's The Taming of the Shrew in 1957, and the titular role, of legless pilot Aleksey Maresyev, in the first (and only) recording of Prokofiev's The Story of a Real Man conducted by Mark Ermler in 1961.

References

Biography in Russian

1932 births
2003 deaths
20th-century Russian male opera singers
Musicians from Kyiv
Academic staff of Moscow Conservatory
Moscow Conservatory alumni
Honored Artists of the RSFSR
People's Artists of the RSFSR
Recipients of the Order of the Red Banner of Labour
Russian male opera singers
Russian music educators
Russian operatic baritones
Soviet male opera singers
Soviet music educators
Burials at Vagankovo Cemetery